Kirby Lane Larson from Kenmore, Washington is an American writer of children's books including Oppenheim Toy Portfolio Platinum Award-winner The Magic Kerchief, illustrated by Rosanne Litzinger. Her book, Hattie Big Sky, was a finalist for the 2007 Scandiuzzi Book Award of the Washington State Book Awards, and won a 2007 Newbery Honor. Kirby is retired from the faculty at the Whidbey Writers Workshop MFA program.  Two Bobbies: A True Story of Hurricane Katrina, Friendship, and Survival and Nubs: The True Story of a Mutt, a Marine & a Miracle both have won a Show-Me Award.

Awards
Magic Kerchief, Oppenheim Toy Portfolio Platinum Award
2007: Newbery Honor Award for Hattie Big Sky
2007: American Library Association Best Book for Young Adults for Hattie Big Sky
2008: ASPCA Henry Bergh Non-Fiction Companion Animal Children's Book Award for Two Bobbies: A True Story of Hurricane Katrina, Friendship, and Survival
2009: Southern Independent Booksellers Alliance Children's Book Award for Two Bobbies: A True Story of Hurricane Katrina, Friendship, and Survival
2010: Christopher Award for Nubs: The True Story of a Mutt, a Marine & a Miracle
2011: South Carolina Association of School Librarians Picture Book Award for Two Bobbies: A True Story of Hurricane Katrina, Friendship, and Survival
2015: National Parenting Publications Awards Gold Award for Dash
2015: Scott O'Dell Award for Historical Fiction for Dash
2016: South Carolina Association of School Librarians Children's Book Award for Duke
2017: Finalist, Washington State Book Award Books for Middle Grade Readers for Audacity Jones to the Rescue

Bibliography
 Second-Grade Pig Pals (1994)
Cody and Quinn, Sitting in a Tree (1996)
 The Magic Kerchief (2000)
 Hattie Big Sky (2006)
 Two Bobbies: A True Story of Hurricane Katrina, Friendship, and Survival (2008) 
 Nubs: The True Story of a Mutt, a Marine & a Miracle (2009) 
The Fences Between Us: The Diary of Piper Davis, Seattle Washington, 1941 (2010)
The Friendship Doll (2011)
Bitty Baby at the Ballet (2013)
Bitty Baby and Me (2013)
Bitty Baby the Brave (2013)
Hattie Ever After (2013)
Princess Bitty Baby (2013)
Bitty Baby Loves the Snow (2013)
Duke (2013)
Bitty Baby Has a Tea Party (2014)
Bitty Baby Makes a Splash (2014)
Dash (2014)
Liberty (2016)
Audacity Jones to the Rescue (2016)
Audacity Jones Steals the Show (2017)
Code Word Courage (2018)

References

External links
 
 Kirby's Lane official blog
 Hattie Big Sky
 2008 Audio Interview of Kirby Larson at Childrensbookradio
 MotherDaughterBookClub.com 2010 interview with Kirby Larson at MotherDaughterBookClub
 

Living people
Year of birth missing (living people)
Place of birth missing (living people)
American children's writers
American historical novelists
Newbery Honor winners
People from Kenmore, Washington
Novelists from Washington (state)
21st-century American novelists
20th-century American women writers
21st-century American women writers
20th-century American writers
American women children's writers
American women novelists
Women historical novelists